SS Hastier was a  coaster which sank on her maiden voyage in April 1919.

Description
Hastier was built as yard number 131 by Scheepsbouwwerf & Maschinenfabriek De Klop, Sliedrecht, Netherlands.

History
Hastier was built for Lloyd Royal Belge, SA. Her port of registry was Antwerp. She departed Antwerp on her maiden voyage on 9 April 1919, bound for Brixham, United Kingdom where she loaded a cargo of coal. On 13 April, she departed Brixham bound for Barcelona, Spain, with an ultimate destination of Valencia. The lifeboat was landed at Guernsey. Captain Fierens and his crew of 16 were all lost with the ship.

References

1919 ships
Ships built in the Netherlands
Steamships of Belgium
Merchant ships of Belgium
Shipwrecks in the English Channel
Maritime incidents in 1919